Meshal Al-Enazi, (born February 20, 1979 ), is a Qatari footballer, who currently plays with Al-Arabi SC (Qatar) of Qatar. He has been active with the club since 2011, and has not yet recorded a goal with the club.

References

1979 births
Living people
Qatari footballers
Al Ahli SC (Doha) players
Al-Sailiya SC players
Al-Arabi SC (Qatar) players
Qatar Stars League players
Qatari Second Division players
Association football defenders